The Cremaster Cycle is a series of five feature-length films, together with related sculptures, photographs, drawings, and artist's books, created by American visual artist and filmmaker Matthew Barney.

The Cremaster Cycle was made over a period of eight years (1994–2002) and culminated in a major museum exhibition organized by Nancy Spector of the Solomon R. Guggenheim Museum in New York City, which traveled to the Museum Ludwig in Cologne and the Musée d'art Moderne in Paris from 2002-03. Barney's longtime collaborator Jonathan Bepler composed and arranged the soundtracks for the films. The series incorporates a multidisciplinary narrative that heavily references connections between real people, real places and real things personal to Barney himself, but are all fictionalized to some extent.

Overview

Guggenheim Museum curator Nancy Spector has described the Cremaster cycle (1994–2002) as "a self-enclosed aesthetic system." The cycle includes the films as well as photographs, drawings, sculptures, and installations the artist produced in conjunction with each episode. Its conceptual departure point is the male cremaster muscle, the primary function of which is to raise and lower the testes in response to temperature. The project is filled with anatomical allusions to the position of the reproductive organs during the embryonic process of sexual differentiation: Cremaster 1 represents the most "ascended" or undifferentiated state, Cremaster 5 the most "descended" or differentiated. The cycle repeatedly returns to those moments during early sexual development in which the outcome of the process is still unknown — in Barney's metaphoric universe, these moments represent a condition of pure potentiality. As the cycle evolved over eight years, Barney looked beyond biology as a way to explore the creation of form, employing narrative models from other realms, such as biography, mythology, and geology. Barney portrays, at various points, a satyr and Gary Gilmore. Ursula Andress portrays the Queen of Chain in Cremaster 5. Norman Mailer, Patty Griffin, and Dave Lombardo portray Harry Houdini, Nicole Baker, and Johnny Cash respectively in Cremaster 2. Richard Serra and Aimee Mullins portray Hiram Abiff and Sadhbh respectively, in Cremaster 3.

Numerical and thematic chronology 

While thematically the Cremaster films are chronological in the numbered order, they were not made or released in the same manner. The order in which they were made is as follows:

The numerical order is the thematic order, while in order of production the films increased in production quality, ambition and scope, and they can alternatively be viewed in any order, as different views of a set of themes and preoccupations.

The films are significantly different in length; the longest (and last-made) is Cremaster 3, at over three hours, while the remaining four are approximately an hour each, for a total of approximately seven hours – #3 alone makes up almost half the total length of the cycle. Like Barney's other works, most of the films lack any particular dialogue with the exceptions being Cremaster 2 and 5, the latter of which is an opera sung in Hungarian.

An important precursor of The Cremaster Cycle is Drawing Restraint, which is also a biologically inspired multi-episode work in multiple media, also featuring the field emblem.

Availability 
The full series was released in a limited series of 20 sets of DVDs, sold for at least $100,000 each, in custom packaging and as fine art, rather than mass-market movies. In 2007 one disc (Cremaster 2) sold for $571,000.

The films are not available on mass-market DVDs, and according to the press release for the 2010 US tour, the cycle "is Not Now Nor Will it Ever be Available on DVD". The films are primarily available via periodic screenings. Palm Pictures, the distributor, has continued to comply with Barney's request, and has not made the series available on DVD, though there were some rumors and announcements to this effect in 2003. Only a 31-minute excerpt, the Guggenheim scene from Cremaster 3 entitled “The Order,” was released on mass-market DVD in 2003.

Reception
Reaction to the cycle is sharply divided – some consider it a major work of art, on a par with Un Chien Andalou and The Waste Land, while others dismiss it as vapid, self-indulgent tedium. This is summarized by one critic as "Barney's cinematic art inspires both awe and revulsion, often simultaneously." Indeed, the Village Voice featured two reviews, with art critic Jerry Saltz praising the cycle, and film critic J. Hoberman panning it.

Lavish praise includes: "The Cremaster Cycle by Matthew Barney is the first truly great piece of cinema to be made in a fine art context since Dali and Bunuel filmed Un Chien Andalou in 1929. It is one of the most imaginative and brilliant achievements in the history of avant-garde cinema." In 1999, when three of its entries (the fourth, first, and fifth) had been made, Michael Kimmelman of The New York Times hailed Barney as "the most important American artist of his generation." It has also, on the other hand, received scathing criticism as "a mostly tedious succession of striking but vacant imagery whose effect diminishes the longer you look at it," from which "any sense of mystery or wonder is drained."

The visuals are roundly praised, however, and some (Hoberman) feel that the movies work well as parts of installations, due to visuals, though not as movies, due to poor editing and pacing.

Further reading
The large volume by then Guggenheim curator Nancy Spector, Matthew Barney: The Cremaster Cycle (New York: Guggenheim Museum Publications, 2002), is the standard work on the Cycle and contains reproductions of production stills, concept drawings and an exegetical essay by Spector, Only The Perverse Fantasy Can Still Save Us. Neville Wakefield has produced The Cremaster Glossary, which is also included in the book.

References

External links

Sites
 
 Cremaster Fanatic – The Matthew Barney Fan Site

Reviews
 Metacritic: Cremaster 3
 Metacritic: Cremaster Cycle
 
 The Cremaster Cycle, Peter Bradshaw, The Guardian, 17 October 2003
 
 Man vs. 'Cremaster': The 10-Hour Test, by John Rockwell, March 23, 2003
 Cults of Personality, J. Hoberman, Mar 11 2003, Village Voice
 Swept Away: On Still Being Smitten With Matthew Barney, by Jerry Saltz, Feb 25 2003, Village Voice
 The Cremaster Cycle at IFC: Matthew Barney exposes his films again, Nathan Lee, May 18, 2010, Village Voice
 Cremaster works, OFFOFFOFF film review, David N. Butterworth
 Time Out Film Guide
 The Cremaster Cycle (2002), Movie Gazette – brief synopsis and review

Other
 "I DIE DAILY: The Making of Matthew Barney's Cremaster Cycle", Feature Documentary—by Matthew Wallin
 Guggenheim Cremaster Cycle – Arts Curriculum Lessons Online
 "Occupying the Space of Possibility: Matthew Barney's Cremaster Cycle"—by Daniel Read
 Holden, Stephen. "Cremaster 3 (2002) FILM REVIEW; Racing Dead Horses. Dental Torture. The Usual.." The New York Times. May 15, 2002.

1994 films
1995 films
1996 films
1997 films
2002 films
Film series introduced in 1994
American avant-garde and experimental films
Avant-garde and experimental film series
American nonlinear narrative films
Video art
Mormonism in fiction
1990s American films
2000s American films